Squid Game (Original Soundtrack to the Netflix Series) is the soundtrack to the Korean survival drama television series of the same name. The score for the series is composed by Jung Jae-il in his maiden television debut. While Jae-il composed most of the cues, he later collaborated with Park Min-ju and Kim Sung-soo (under the stage name "23") for additional music. The album featured 21 tracks was released on September 17, 2021 by Genie Music and Stone Music Entertainment.

Development 
Jung Jae-il was first approached by the director following his critical acclaim to the score he composed for Parasite (2019). It marked his maiden television debut. Compared to feature film composition, the score for Squid Game demanded on being "bigger, longer and slightly different". Jae-il took a long time to compose the series, and to prevent the score from becoming boring, he asked the help of two other composers: Park Min-ju and Kim Sung-soo (under the stage name "23") for additional music. The original score for the 9-episode series consisted a variety of musical styles and the instrumentation ranges from guitar and percussions to have a contemporary western music, with synth-rock, jazz and orchestral music, being juxtaposed with each mood of the scene. Speaking to Gold Derby, Jae-il had said "the music should not be in the foreground of the scene, but at the same time, music can show something completely different to the scene".

Apart from the original score, two classical music pieces were used throughout the score, depicting as the routine part of the players: the third movement of Joseph Haydn's "Trumpet Concerto" is used to wake the players, while Johann Strauss II's "The Blue Danube" is used to indicate the start of a new game. Ludwig van Beethoven's "Fifth Symphony" is also used as the background score in the VIP lounge, and Tchaikovsky’s “Serenade for Strings" also play in the series. A cover version of "Fly Me to the Moon", arranged by Jae-il and sung by Korean artist Joo Won Shin, was used over the "Red Light, Green Light" game of the first episode. According to Joo, the showrunner Hwang Dong-hyuk wanted a contrast between the brutal killing of the players in the game and the "romantic and beautiful lyrics and melody" of the song, such that the scene "embodies the increasingly polarized capitalist society that we live in today in a very compressed and cynical way". Jae-il intended that the director already chose the classical pieces during the scripting process as he felt that "the music should be something that feels familiar to everyone".

For the song "Way Back Then" that accompanies children playing Squid Game, Jung wanted to use instruments that he practiced in elementary school, such as recorders and castanets. The rhythm of the song is based on a 3-3-7 clapping rhythm that is commonly used in South Korea to cheer someone on. The recorder, played by Jung himself, had a slight "beep", which was unintentional. "Pink Soldiers", an a cappella composed by 23, was featured throughout the series. The recording of the jazz band and orchestral music was mostly done by the Budapest Scoring Orchestra featuring over 50-60 musicians, while the minimal piano and guitar portions were recorded by Jae-il himself. Additional instrumentation, include the rhythming of ethnic drums in the brief moments of the game. Jae-il initially requested on using heavy metal sounds in the score, but later disapproved as it would not feel appropriate to the scenes. The percussion instruments were imported from Brazil and Senegal to create a tense score.

Bálint Sapszon and Norbert Elek worked on the orchestration for the score, soundtrack and the classical pieces, at the Budapest Scoring Orchestra which was conducted by Péter Illényi. Sapszon and Elek stated that recording for the classical works were easier, as the compositions were written earlier and they only had to re-record the pieces.

Track listing

Accolades

Notes

References 

2021 soundtrack albums
Soundtracks by South Korean artists
Genie Music albums
Stone Music Entertainment albums
Television soundtracks
Squid Game